The Kukës County in northeastern Albania is subdivided into 3 municipalities. These municipalities contain 180 towns and villages:

References